The Fastnet Race is a biennial offshore yacht race organised by the Royal Ocean Racing Club (RORC) of the United Kingdom with the assistance of the Royal Yacht Squadron in Cowes and the City of Cherbourg in France. 

The race is named after the Fastnet Rock off southern Ireland, which the race course rounds. Testing both inshore and offshore skills, boat and crew preparation and speed potential. From its inception, the Fastnet Race has proven highly influential in the growth of offshore racing, and remains closely linked to advances in yacht design, sailing technique and safety equipment.

The Fastnet Race has been sponsored by the Swiss watch manufacturing company Rolex since 2001. The Race prize is known as the Fastnet Challenge Cup.

The race main focus is on monohull handicap racing which presently is conducted under the Royal Ocean Racing Club own IRC Rating Rule and it is this that is awarded the overall trophy. However the race has more recently opened itself up allowing multihulls and providing one design class starts for the Volvo Ocean Race Class, IMOCA 60 and Class40. It has also seen an increase in participation in two person

Course

The Fastnet is a challenging race. Taking place in August, the race is often provided with Westerlies that are strong to gale force in strength. The succession of low pressure systems which advance on Ireland and Britain across the North Atlantic Ocean provide a constantly moving weather pattern for which Fastnet navigators must plan. These depressions are mostly centered north of the English Channel. Knowledge of where meteorological disturbances are likely to occur, and how best to use them, is the keynote to success in the race.

1925 to 2019 course

The race started off Cowes on the Isle of Wight on the south coast of England at the Royal Yacht Squadron. Leaving The Solent through The Needles Channel, the race followed the southern coastline of England westward down the English Channel before rounding Land's End. After crossing the Celtic Sea, the race rounded the Fastnet Rock off the southwest coast of Ireland. Returning on a largely reciprocal course, the race rounded the Isles of Scilly before finishing at Plymouth.

The Royal Western Yacht Club who supported the RORC with the finish of the race in Plymouth now run a race on the original course.

2021 course
The race starts off the Royal Yacht Squadron start line of Cowes on the Isle of Wight on the south coast of England at the Royal Yacht Squadron. Leaving The Solent through The Needles Channel, the race follows the southern coastline of England westward down the English Channel, before rounding Land's End. After crossing the Celtic Sea, the race rounds the Fastnet Rock off the southwest coast of Ireland. Returning on a largely reciprocal course, the race rounds the Isles of Scilly before finishing at Cherbourg.

The finish was changed to Cherbourg from Plymouth in order to accommodate increased fleet sizes. Facilities at Plymouth were cited by organizers as one of the main reasons for the change. This was not universally accepted due to the nearly 100 year heritage of the course and race.

Coastal landmarks passed along the route include: The Needles, Portland Bill, Start Point, The Lizard, Land's End, the Fastnet Rock, Bishop's Rock off the Scillies and Cherbourg breakwater.

History
Weston Martyr, a British yachtsman, conceived the idea of the race after having competed in Bermudian yacht races. Entered by seven vessels, the inaugural Fastnet Race was won by Jolie Brise in 1925.

1979 Fastnet Race

A severe storm during the 1979 race resulted in the deaths of nineteen people (fifteen competing yachtsmen and four rescuers) and the involvement of some 4,000 others in what became the largest ever rescue operation in peacetime. This led to a major overhaul of the rules and the equipment required for the competition. Several books have since been written about the 1979 race, which remains notorious in the yachting world for its loss of life. In the 1979 race, "15 sailors died, five boats sank, and at least 75 boats flipped upside down".

Capsize of Drum (1985)
The race drew further attention from outside the sport in 1985 when the maxi yacht Drum capsized after the keel sheared off due to a design error.  The boat was helmed by the New Zealander Phil Holland, brother of its designer Ron Holland.  Pop star Simon Le Bon from Duran Duran, co-owner and crew member of Drum, was trapped under the hull with five other crew members for twenty minutes, until being rescued by the Royal Navy. The Search and Rescue Diver was Petty Officer Air Crewman (POACMN) Larry "Scouse" Slater of 771 Naval Air Squadron who appeared on This Is Your Life on 9 April 1986.

1999 Fastnet Race
Many of the fleet contestants experienced a total solar eclipse in the Celtic Sea on the way to the Fastnet Rock.

2007 Fastnet Race
The RORC in 2007 set an entry limit of 300 boats for the first time. The start of the 2007 Race was postponed by 25 hours, due to a severe weather warning. This was the first time this had been done in the race's 83-year history. Overnight gale force winds and resulting extreme seas forced over three-quarters of the boats to retire, sheltering in ports along the south coast of England, including Torbay, Plymouth and Weymouth.

By 10:00hrs on 16 August, 207 boats of the 271-strong field had retired with at least three suffering rig problems.

Despite the conditions, Mike Slade's Icap Leopard 3, launched in June 2007, set a new record of 44 hours 18 min, taking almost 9 hours off the previous record set in 1999.  Ger O'Rourke's Chieftain was the overall winner on corrected time.

2011 Fastnet Race

A record number of 320 boats entered the 2011 race – the largest total since the ill-fated 1979 race (303 entries). A total of nineteen nations were represented, with the bulk of entries still from Britain and France.

In 2011, the 100-foot maxi yacht Rambler 100 turtled after her keel broke off between Fastnet Rock and the Pantaenius Buoy (a temporary race mark placed southwest of the Fastnet Rock). All 21 crew were rescued safely. Sixteen were rescued from the upturned hull, by the RNLI Baltimore Lifeboat Hilda Jarrett.  A further 5 crewmembers, including the owner/skipper George David, had floated away from the vessel, but managed to link themselves together.  They were in the water for approximately 2.5 hours, before being rescued by a Baltimore based diving vessel, Wave Chieftain.  One of these crewmembers, Wendy Touton, suffered hypothermia and was taken by helicopter to Tralee General Hospital. Four crew-members had been below decks at the time of capsize and were not adequately dressed for egress into the sea. All uninjured crew were taken to Baltimore. The Naval Service patrol ship LÉ Aoife remained with the hull, worth $10,000,000 before the capsize, before it was towed to Barleycove by the Castletownbere-based tug Ocean Bank.

The Fastnet Monohull Race record was set at 42hrs 39min by Volvo Open 70 "Abu Dhabi", skippered by Ian Walker.

2013 Fastnet Race
Plymouth Yacht Haven was selected as host port RORC Increased the number of entries to meet demands. With the entry limit of 300 filled within 24 hours, over 100 boats on the waiting list and entries from multihulls, IMOCA 60s and Class 40s still coming in, demand for places in 2013's Fastnet Race has been at its highest level thus far.

Winners (the following results are to be considered provisional):
IRC Overall: Night And Day, a JPK 10.10 owned by Pascal Loison;
MOCRA Multihull: Oman Air - Musandam, a MOD 70 owned by Sidney Gavignet.

2015 Fastnet Race
The 340-boat registration limit was reached in 4 minutes and 24 seconds setting a new record.

Winners:

IRC Overall: Courrier Du Leon, a JPK 10.10 owned by Géry Trentesaux.

MOCRA Multihull: Spindrift 2 a VPLP owned by Yann Guichard & Dona Bertarelli.

Line Honours: 2 Days 15 Hours 42 Minutes - Comanche - VPLP/Verdier 100 Super Maxi Owned by Jim & Kristy Hinze Clark, Skippered by Ken Read

2017 Fastnet Race

The 2017 Fastnet Race started on 6 August 2017 and featured all 2017-2018 Volvo Ocean Race Teams. Yachts longer than 100 feet were also allowed to race.

Winners:

IRC Overall: Lann Ael 2, a JNA 39 owned by Didier Gaudoux.

MOCRA Multihull: Concise 10 a MOD 70 owned by Tony Lawson.

Line Honours: 1 Day 18 hours and 55 minutes – Concise 10 – MOD 70 owned by Tony Lawson, Skippered by Ned Collier Wakefield.

2019 Fastnet Race
The 2019 Fastnet Race started on 3 August 2019. For the first time, boats not following the IRC standard were allowed to enter the competition. All entries were filled within four minutes and 37 seconds when entry opened on 7 January.

Skipper Franck Cammas took Multihull line honours, despite running aground within the first few hours. This was the first sub-30 hour run, beating Loick Peyron and the crew of Banque Populaire’s 2011 time by 4h 45m. The Macif of Francois Gabbart lost the line honours by only 58 seconds, having led just minutes in prior. In third place, was the Sodebo Ultim 3 of Thomas Coville.

The adjusted time race was won by the Wizard, a Volvo Open 70, owned by David and Peter Askew and sailed by Charlie Enright.

2021 Fastnet Race
Scenes off Cowes seafront at the start:

2021 was the first year where the race finish was in Cherbourg. It started on the 8 August 2021 in a strong south westerly breeze.

Winners:

IRC Overall: Sunrise, a JPK 1180 owned by Thomas Kneen and navigated by Tom Cheney & Suzy Peters

MOCRA Multihull: Allegra, a 84 ft Nigel Irens designed catamaran sailed by Adrian Keller

IMOCA 60: Apivia saild by Charlie Dalin & Paul Meilhat

Race records

Original Course
The monohull race record is 42hrs 39min, set by Ian Walker's Volvo Open 70 Abu Dhabi (UAE) in 2011. The other two Volvo Open 70 participating in the 2011 Fastnet Race (Groupama 4 and Team Sanya) also broke the previous record, which had been set by ICAP Leopard in 2007.

The multihull race record is currently 28h 02m 26s by Maxi Edmond de Rotschild. Skipper Franck Cammas took Multihull line honours on August 4, 2019, despite running aground within the first few hours. This was the first sub-30 hour run, beating Loick Peyron and the crew of Banque Populaire’s 2011 time by 4h 45m. The Macif of Francois Gabbart lost the line honours by only 58 seconds, having led just minutes prior.

The World Speed Sailing Record Council also recognises the course record for an official record, which is currently held by Maserati, a MOD 70 skippered by Giovanni Soldini, on May 21, 2021 in a time of 23hrs, 51mins and 16secs, beating the previous record by more than one hour and bringing the record under 24 hours.

Revised Course 
In 2021 the course was changed to being from Cowes to Cherbourg in France via the Fastnet Rock.

Winners

Corrected time

Monohull Line honours

Multihull Line honours

Class 40

IMOCA 60

References

External links
 Rolex Fastnet Race Homepage
 Royal Ocean Racing Club – organising club for the Fastnet Race
 BBC World Service programme, 25 August 2010 – Matthew Sheehan, a sailor in the ill-fated 1979 Race talks to BBC Witness about his experiences and the drowning of his father
 "Night of the Long Grinds" – BBC Sport, Rob Hodgett's Blog, 14 August 2009
 "The Story Of The First Three Fastnet Races"

Fastnet race
Biennial sporting events
Sailing competitions in the United Kingdom
1925 establishments in the United Kingdom
Recurring sporting events established in 1925
Yachting races
Rolex sponsorships